François-Paul Sainte de Wollant (20 September 1752, in Antwerp – 30 November 1818, in Saint Petersburg) was a Flemish engineer. He is best known for a number of fortifications in Imperial Russia which were built under his supervision. In Tiraspol, Transnistria, a park is named after him.

References

External links

1752 births
1818 deaths
Flemish military engineers
Russian military engineers
19th-century Belgian engineers
18th-century engineers
Engineers from Antwerp